Tomb of the Golden Bird (2006) is the 18th in a series of historical mystery novels, written by Elizabeth Peters and featuring fictional sleuth and archaeologist Amelia Peabody.

Explanation of the novel's title

The title comes from the nickname given the tomb of Tutankhamon by Egyptian workers, who were fascinated by Howard Carter's pet canary, and certain that the golden bird would bring a lucky season.

Plot summary
Howard Carter returns as a featured character, as the Emersons are privy to his discovery of the tomb of Tutankhamon.

See also

List of characters in the Amelia Peabody series

Amelia Peabody
2006 American novels
Novels set in Egypt
HarperCollins books
Cultural depictions of Tutankhamun
Historical mystery novels